Turaif Domestic Airport is an airport serving Turaif, a town in Northern Borders Province, Saudi Arabia. The nearest airports are Arar Domestic Airport in Arar and Gurayat Domestic Airport in Gurayat (Qurayyat). The airport was established in 1979.

Facilities

Airlines and destinations

Airlines offering scheduled passenger service:

See also 

 Saudia
 List of airports in Saudi Arabia
 King Abdulaziz International Airport

References

External links
 
 
 

Airports in Saudi Arabia
Northern Borders Province
1979 establishments in Saudi Arabia